"Atlanta Lady (Something About Your Love)" is a song written by Jesse Barish and performed by Marty Balin. It reached #11 on the U.S. adult contemporary chart and #27 on the Billboard Hot 100 in 1981. The song was on his 1981 album, Balin.

The song was produced by John Hug.

References

1981 songs
1981 singles
Songs written by Jesse Barish
Marty Balin songs
EMI America Records singles